The following is a list of pipeline accidents in the United States in 2000. It is one of several lists of U.S. pipeline accidents. See also list of natural gas and oil production accidents in the United States.

This is not a complete list of all pipeline accidents. For natural gas alone, the Pipeline and Hazardous Materials Safety Administration (PHMSA), a United States Department of Transportation agency, has collected data on more than 3,200 accidents deemed serious or significant since 1987.

A "significant incident" results in any of the following consequences:
 fatality or injury requiring in-patient hospitalization
 $50,000 or more in total costs, measured in 1984 dollars
 liquid releases of five or more barrels (42 US gal/barrel)
 releases resulting in an unintentional fire or explosion.

PHMSA and the National Transportation Safety Board (NTSB) post incident data and results of investigations into accidents involving pipelines that carry a variety of products, including natural gas, oil, diesel fuel, gasoline, kerosene, jet fuel,  carbon dioxide, and other substances. Occasionally pipelines are repurposed to carry different products.

Incidents 

 On January 1, 2000, at Whitewater, Michigan, two snowmobile riders in the pipeline right of way had mechanical problems and were using a cigarette lighter to see better when leaking natural gas ignited. Both snowmobilers were treated for their burns and released. The pipeline was owned by Michigan Consolidated Gas Company (MICHCON). Investigators found that the pipe, which was installed in 1973, had leaked due to internal corrosion.
 On January 10, approximately 4200 gallons of jet fuel were discharged from Plantation Pipeline in Newington, Virginia, some of which entered into Accotink Creek and its adjoining shorelines. The failure resulted from a failed gasket on an interface detector.
 On January 21, a Chevron pipeline leaked from a welding flaw near Corinne, Utah, spilling about 4200 gallons of diesel fuel. The product spread over 38 acres of salt flat and wetlands used by birds. About 75% to 80% of the spill was intentionally burned to eliminate it.
 On January 21, an Equilon Pipeline Co. crude oil line was ruptured off of the Louisiana coast, by an eight-ton anchor dropped by a ship. About 94,000 gallons of crude oil were spilled, creating a slick 2 miles wide by 7 miles long.
NTSB investigators found a dent on the bottom of the pipe in the rupture area. Marathon spent about $7.1 million in response to the accident.
 On February 2, an Equilon Pipeline Co. pipeline leaked 756 gallons of crude oil, in Jefferson County, Texas, west of Highway 366, causing estimated $75,000 in property damage. Corrosion was listed as the cause of the leak.
The source of the spill was a break in a miter bend in the pipe, which was estimated to be at least 50 years old.
 On February 18, 2000, a 24-inch diameter Tennessee Gas Pipeline at Marcellus, New York, leaked natural gas due to a crack in the pipe, thought to be caused by a manufacturing defect in the pipe which had been manufactured and installed in 1951.
 On February 23, 2000, in Clare County, Michigan, the ANR Pipeline Company’s 12-inch diameter Lincoln Pipeline ruptured. Factors contributing to the leak were frost heave, mismatch of pipe ends, residual forces applied during clamping of the pipe replacement ends to the existing pipeline, unusually cold weather on the day of the rupture, and non-homogeneous material in the weld metal at the origin of the fracture that reduced effective thickness of the pipe wall. The pipe was manufactured in 1951.
 On March 9, an Explorer petroleum products pipeline failed in Greenville, Texas. The 28-inch pipeline ruptured and released  of gasoline. The released gasoline eventually reached East Caddo Creek. The banks of the tributary and creek contained the escaping gasoline as it flowed away from the ruptured pipe. The probable cause of the pipeline failure was corrosion-fatigue cracking that initiated at the edge of the longitudinal seam weld at a likely preexisting weld defect. Contributing to the failure was the loss of pipe coating integrity.
 On March 17, about 3300 gallons of crude oil spilled into the Miller Branch Creek bed, near Stiles, Louisiana, when a small oil pipeline was snapped by a falling tree. Approximately 200 yards of the Miller Branch Creek bed, which flows into the James Bayou, was affected. The James Bayou flows in Caddo Lake, two miles south of the spill. Another spill not far from the Stiles site had occurred two days earlier, when 12,600 gallons of crude was discharged into a creek, after a bulldozer ran over a pipeline.
 On March 22, in Karnes County, Texas, a PG&E 20-inch diameter natural gas pipeline blew out through pavement and was on fire eight miles south of Kenedy, Texas, on U.S. Highway 181. Work began the same day to repair the road. The leak was caused by external corrosion of the pipe, which was manufactured in 1961.
 On April 7, a pipeline released fuel oil at Chalk Point, near Aquasco, Maryland. The Piney Point Oil Pipeline system, which was owned by the Potomac Electric Power Company (Pepco), experienced a pipe failure at the Chalk Point Generating Station in southeastern Prince George's County, Maryland. The release was not discovered and addressed by the contract operating company, Support Terminal Services, Inc., until the late afternoon. Approximately  of fuel oil were released into the surrounding wetlands and Swanson Creek and, subsequently, the Patuxent River as a result of the accident. No injuries were caused by the accident, which cost approximately $71 million for environmental response and clean-up operations.
 On May 2, 2000, at Greenville, Mississippi, six workers were injured during a turbine construction project at the Williams Gas Pipeline-Southcentral natural gas compressor station. A flash fire occurred when contractor employees were beginning to install an isolation cap on a 26-inch diameter natural gas line. The fire extinguished itself. Evidence available has not allowed determination of cause.
 On May 13, 2000, at a Texas Eastern Transmission Corporation (Duke) compressor station in Perry County, Pennsylvania, the emergency shutdown device was activated by a lightning strike to the compressor unit gas monitor. All equipment operated properly with the exception of a suction valve that malfunctioned and did not close automatically. This allowed gas to continue venting to atmosphere in a controlled manner for nearly an hour until the valve was manually closed. The part was installed in 1958.
 On May 19, a Colonial Pipeline Co. line failed near Greensboro, North Carolina. At least 714 gallons (17 barrels) of kerosene spilled, some of which entered a pond that flows into a tributary of the East Fork Deep River. The kerosene spill caused a sheen about 40 feet by 40 feet in the pond. As a result of this, and six other previous Colonial Pipeline accidents, the EPA fined Colonial $34 million in 2003.
 On June 7, a stopple fitting weld failed on a Wolverine Pipeline Company line, causing a rupture releasing  of gasoline into the environment, and causing the evacuation of more than 500 houses in Blackman Charter Township, Michigan. The failure caused the shutdown of 30% of Michigan's gasoline supplies for nine days, contaminated a creek which flows into the Grand River, and a railroad track near the failure site was shut down for a week. Later tests found 715 anomalies in this pipeline. Wolverine later agreed to pay for switching houses in the area from local water wells to a city water source.
 On June 28, 2000, at Prentiss, Mississippi, an 8-inch high pressure natural gas pipeline ruptured, releasing gas. A local landowner notified the Prentiss Volunteer Fire Department and AIM Pipeline Company gas control of the leak. The gas ignited within half an hour. No effort was made to extinguish the fire; it was allowed to burn under control. Within three hours the fuel had been consumed and the fire was contained. As a precaution, the Prentiss Volunteer Fire Department evacuated three nearby residences. All residents were allowed to return to their homes that evening. There were no injuries and no major property damage. The rupture in the pipe measured six inches by three inches. The rupture point in the pipe was in a low-lying area on the bottom of the line approximately two inches from a joint weld. The pipe was installed in 1975.
 On July 5, two boats hit a Southern Natural Gas pipeline off the coast of Plaquemines, Louisiana, causing a gas fire that burned five members of the boat crews. The fire could be seen from 35 miles away.
The force of the escaping gas created a -wide crater about  along the pipe. The cause of the failure was severe internal corrosion of the pipe, which was manufactured in 1950. On July 26, 2007, a USDOJ Consent Decree was later entered into by the pipeline owner to perform pipeline system upgrades to allow better internal pipeline inspections.
 On August 20, a gas pipeline exploded and burned in Concord, North Carolina. A nearby shopping mall was evacuated but there were no injuries.
 On August 24, a 6-inch pipeline operated by Chevron failed from alleged external corrosion, spilling 126,000 gallons of crude oil into an unnamed creek, near Snyder, Texas. The creek was dry at the time. Later, a Federal Court ruled that the Clean Water Act did not apply, since there was no water flowing in the creek at the time.
 On August 28, 2000, at Denver City, Texas, an El Paso Natural Gas Company 30-inch diameter pipeline leak was discovered in a farmer’s field after EPNG was informed of darkened soil. After the line was excavated, the leak was found at a weld failure where a mechanical clamp repaired an older leak adjacent to the long seam of the pipe, which was manufactured in 1948.
 On September 7, on State Route 36 south of Abilene, Texas, a bulldozer ruptured a 12-inch diameter NGL pipeline, which exploded. An Abilene police detective with 21 years of service was severely burned when the vapors ignited; he later died. Nearby, a woman saved herself by going underwater in her swimming pool, but her house was destroyed by the explosion and fire. The pipeline's owner, ExxonMobil, was fined by the Texas Railroad Commission for not marking the pipeline's location.
 On September 26, 2000, at Mission, Texas, a Kinder Morgan 12-inch diameter pipe ruptured due to external corrosion. The pipe was manufactured in 1956.
 On September 27, 2000, in Spearman, Texas, a 26-inch diameter pipe owned by Kinder Morgan’s Natural Gas Pipeline Company of America sprung a pinhole leak at a butt weld. The pipe was manufactured in 1947.
 On October 12, 2000, at Edna, Texas, a Tennessee Gas Pipeline  24-inch diameter pipe manufactured in 1944 ruptured. Investigators reported that a weld cracked due to external corrosion.
 On November 3, a front end loader punctured an 8-inch pipeline carrying Diesel fuel in Lancaster County, Pennsylvania. Diesel fuel sprayed  into the air.
 On November 28, in Portland, Tennessee, a Tennessee Gas Pipeline Company maintenance crew was welding an oil lubrication line at a compressor station when an explosion and flash fire occurred, injuring three workers. Apparently, gas from the compressor migrated into a crankcase and was ignited by a spark. The equipment was installed in 1950.
 On December 4, 2000, near Baytown, Texas, an El Paso Field Services 30-inch diameter pipeline ruptured and gas blew into the air. The Beach City fire department reported a flume of natural gas but no fire at the junction of Highway 565 and Needlepoint Road (FM 2354) and partially evacuated the area. The pipe was manufactured and installed in 1955.
 On December 16, 2000, an incident occurred at an Illinois Power Company natural gas plant in Irving, Illinois. While conducting a routine inspection, the plant operator determined that water should be transferred from the water separator tank to the produced water holding tank and began to transfer the water. When he no longer heard water flowing through the transfer line, he closed the valve, but then abnormal sounds came from the holding tank. Seconds later, a violent roar erupted and the lights went out. Scanning outside with a flashlight, he saw large pieces of metallic debris. The 50,000 gallon water holding tank was dislodged from its foundation and moved about 300 feet. A factor contributing to the accident was severe weather conditions: temperature 5 degrees Fahrenheit, wind velocity 35 mph gusting to 40-45 mph, wind chill minus 35 to 45 degrees Fahrenheit.

References 

Lists of pipeline accidents in the United States
2000 disasters in the United States